Kofi Balmer (born 19 September 2000) is a Northern Irish professional footballer who plays for  club Crystal Palace, as a defender.

Club career 
Kofi Balmer made his professional debut for Ballymena United in April 2017, aged only 16, during the late stages of the NIFL Premiership.

With the club from Ballymena he started a total of 74 Premiership games, also being named Ulster Young Footballer of the Year in 2019. By 2021, he had become a key member of the team, delivering decisive performances on a regular basis.

After playing semi-professional football at Ballymena for 5 seasons, he joined Premiership rivals Larne FC to become a full-time professional. During the 2021–22 season he played a total of 45 games with 7 goals for the club, including the Europa Conference League qualifying matches, where Larne made it to the 3rd round only being knocked out by Portuguese Primeira Liga side Paços de Ferreira, despite a 1–0 home win. 

His team also managed to win the County Antrim Shield, beating league champions Linfield in the final, Balmer playing taking part in this 1-0 victory on 11 January 2022, despite having to face his father's death the previous week.

Kofi Balmer was transferred to Premier League side Crystal Palace on 11 August 2022, first joining the under-21 squad playing in the Premier League 2.

International career 
Balmer is a youth international for Northern Ireland, having played with the under-19s and under-21s, captaining both sides.

He was first called to the Northern Ireland senior team by Ian Baraclough in September 2022.

Style of play 
Playing mainly as a centre-back, Kofi Balmer is also able to play on both sides, as a full-back or a wing-back.

Honours 
Larne FC

 County Antrim Shield: 2022

Individual

 Ulster Young Footballer of the Year 2018–19

References

External links

Profile with the Northern Ireland Football League

2000 births
Living people
Association footballers from Northern Ireland
Northern Ireland youth international footballers
Northern Ireland under-21 international footballers
Association football defenders
People from Newtownabbey
Sportspeople from County Antrim
Ballymena United F.C. players
NIFL Premiership players